The 2013–14 season of the OK Liga was the 45th season of top-tier rink hockey in Spain.

FC Barcelona returned to win the championship after a one-year hiatus. It was the twenty-fifth title of its history.

Teams

Standings

Top goal scorers

Copa del Rey

The 2014 Copa del Rey was the 71st edition of the Spanish men's roller hockey cup. It was played in Lleida between the seven first qualified teams after the first half of the season and ICG Software Lleida as host team.

Moritz Vendrell repeated as champion and achieved its second trophy.

Quarter-finals

Semifinals

Final

References

External links
Real Federación Española de Patinaje

OK Liga seasons
2013 in roller hockey
2014 in roller hockey
2013 in Spanish sport
2014 in Spanish sport